David Thomson may refer to:

Business
 David Couper Thomson (1861–1954), Scottish publisher, founder of D. C. Thomson & Co.
 David Kinnear Thomson (1910–1992), Scottish businessman
 David Thomson, 3rd Baron Thomson of Fleet (born 1957), Canadian businessman

Entertainment
 David Thomson (film critic) (born 1941), American-based British film critic
 David Thomson (writer) (1914–1988), writer and radio producer
 Dave Thomson (born 1982/83), Canadian songwriter, record producer and former member of Wave

Politics 
 David Thomson (Labor Party politician) (1856–1926), Australian politician
 David Thomson (New Zealand politician) (1915–1999), New Zealand politician
 David Thomson (Australian National Party politician) (1924–2013), Australian politician

Sports 
 Dave Thomson (footballer, born 1938) (1938–2016), Scottish football player for Dunfermline Athletic
 David Thomson (footballer, born 1847) (1847–1876), Welsh international footballer
 David Thomson (footballer, born 1892) (1892–?), Scottish footballer (Dundee FC and Scotland) 
Dave Thomson (footballer, born 1943), Scottish footballer (Rochester Lancers and Toronto Metros)

Other
 David Thomson (bishop) (born 1952), Bishop of Huntingdon
 David Thomson (historian) (1912–1970), English historian
 David and Mary Thomson (1760–1834), Scottish immigrants, first official European settlers in what became Scarborough, Ontario
 David Cleghorn Thomson (1900–1980), Scottish journalist, author and politician
 David Landsborough Thomson (1901–1964), Canadian biochemist
 David J. Thomson, professor of statistics
 David K. Thomson (born 1960s), judge in New Mexico
 David Thomson (physicist) (1817-1880) Scottish physicist

See also
 David Thompson (disambiguation)